Vladimir Borisovich Soshalsky (14 June 1929 in Leningrad, USSR — 10 October 2007 in Moscow, Russia) was a Soviet and Russian film and theater actor. People's Artist of the RSFSR (1988). Real name — Feodosyev.

Biography 
Born on 14 June 1929 in Leningrad in a family of actors Varvara Rozalion-Soshalskaya and Boris Feodosyev. He made his debut on the stage of the young Soshalsky accident: sparkle behind the scenes of the theater, went to the scene right at the time the play by Ibsen's Ghosts. Vladimir felt the magic of the scene and decided to become an actor. Even before graduating from high school he entered the studio of the Bryantsev Youth Theatre. It was at the Youth Theatre Vladimir Soshalsky played his first starring role - Romeo.

Soon the fame reached the Russian Army Theatre. Enrolling to the service in 1951, Vladimir has not parted with the theater until his death.

The film debuted in 1949 in the film Academician Ivan Pavlov.

Personal life
The actor has been married five times. His wives were actresses Olga Aroseva, Alina Pokrovskaya, Nonna Mordyukova, Nelly Podgornaya, Nina Olkhina.

Death
Since the end of August 2007 the actor was in a hospice  – he was diagnosed with prostate cancer, and relatives could not provide adequate care for the sick.

Vladimir Borisovich Soshalsky died on 10 October 2007. He was buried at the Troyekurovskoye Cemetery in Moscow, next to his mother (section No.3).

Partial filmography

 Ivan Pavlov (Иван Павлов, 1949) as Student
 Taras Shevchenko (Тарас Шевченко, 1951) as Nikolay Montelli
 Anna na shee (1954) (uncredited)
 Mikhaylo Lomonosov (1955) as Shuvalov
 Othello (Отелло, 1956) as Cassio
 Chelkash (1957)
 Na grafskikh razvalinakh (1958)
 Matros s Komety (1958) as Vadim Alexandrovich
 Grigoriy Skovoroda (1960) as Valet (uncredited)
 Moskva - Genuya (1964) as Fotokorrespondent (uncredited)
 Eskadra ukhodit na zapad (1965) as Grishin-Almazov
 Zagovor poslov (1966)
 Ogon (1974) as German
 Belyy krug (1975) as «Krupp» Representative
 31 June (31 Июня, 1978, TV Movie) as Plunkett, skipper
 Bezotvetnaya lyubov (1979) as Ayarov
 Prokhindiada, ili Beg na meste (1984)
 Grubaya posadka (1985) as Vasily Polozov
 Investigation Held by ZnaToKi: Midday thief (Следствие ведут ЗнаТоКи, 1985) as Alexey
 Chelovek s akkordeonom (1985)
 Sdelka (1985)
 Salon krasoty (1986) as Grigoryi Sergeyevich
 The Life of Klim Samgin (Жизнь Клима Самгина, 1988, TV Series) as Valentin Bezbedov
 New Adventures of a Yankee in King Arthur's Court (Новые приключения янки при дворе короля Артура, 1988) as Sagramor
 Investigation Held by ZnaToKi: Mafia (Следствие ведут ЗнаТоКи, 1989) as Opium Den Visitor
 Svetik (1989)
 Myshelovka (1990) as Mr. Paravicini
 Viva Gardes-Marines! (Виват, гардемарины!, 1991) as Christian August, Prince of Anhalt-Zerbst
 Ne budite spyashchuyu sobaku (1991)
 Grekh (1992) as Father
 Gospodi, pomiluy zabludshikh (1992)
 Grekh. Istoriya strasti (1993)
 Prokhindiada 2 (1994)

References

External links
 

1929 births
2007 deaths
Male actors from Saint Petersburg
Soviet male actors
Soviet male voice actors
People's Artists of the RSFSR
Burials in Troyekurovskoye Cemetery
Deaths from prostate cancer
Honored Artists of the RSFSR